Eleni Donta-Bali (born June 17, 1980 in Lamia) is a Greek marathon runner. Donta represented Greece at the 2008 Summer Olympics in Beijing, where she competed for the women's marathon. She finished the race in sixtieth place by eighteen seconds ahead of Mexico's Karina Pérez and Colombia's Bertha Sánchez, with a time of 2:46:44.

References

External links

NBC 2008 Olympics profile

Living people
1980 births
Greek female marathon runners
Greek female long-distance runners
Olympic athletes of Greece
Athletes (track and field) at the 2008 Summer Olympics
Sportspeople from Lamia (city)